The 2023 Internazionali di Tennis Città di Rovereto was a professional tennis tournament played on indoor hard courts. It was the first edition of the tournament which was part of the 2023 ATP Challenger Tour. It took place in Rovereto, Italy between 20 and 26 February 2023.

Singles main draw entrants

Seeds

 1 Rankings as of 13 February 2023.

Other entrants
The following players received wildcards into the singles main draw:
  Gianmarco Ferrari
  Marcello Serafini
  Giulio Zeppieri

The following player received entry into the singles main draw as a special exempt:
  Titouan Droguet

The following player received entry into the singles main draw as an alternate:
  Raphaël Collignon

The following players received entry from the qualifying draw:
  Andrea Arnaboldi
  Mathias Bourgue
  Charles Broom
  Bu Yunchaokete
  Marius Copil
  Stefano Travaglia

The following players received entry as lucky losers:
  Evgeny Donskoy
  Alejandro Moro Cañas

Champions

Singles 

  Dominic Stricker def.  Giulio Zeppieri 7–6(10–8), 6–2.

Doubles 

  Victor Vlad Cornea /  Franko Škugor def.  Vladyslav Manafov /  Oleg Prihodko 6–7(3–7), 6–2, [10–4].

References

Internazionali di Tennis Città di Rovereto
2023 in Italian tennis
February 2023 sports events in Italy